St. Charles High School is a 9–12 public high school in St. Charles, Missouri, United States. The other high school in St. Charles, MO is St. Charles West High School.

History
St. Charles High School began as a two-year high school in 1899, expanding to a four-year program in 1902. Originally located at Fourth and Jefferson Streets, it is situated at the former home of the St. Charles Military Academy, to which it moved after a fire in 1918. The campus began with one building in 1923 and had expanded to four by the 1965–66 school year. Within a decade, overcrowding led to the division of the district into two high schools. After a fire in 1995 destroyed all but the oldest section of the building, which was a brick construction, the school was renovated.

The school became racially integrated in 1955.

Visit by President Obama
On March 10, 2010, President Barack Obama made a visit to St. Charles and gave a speech at St. Charles High school, in the older gym on the campus. His speech dealt primarily with the proposed health care reform legislation, and while access to the speech was by invitation only, hundreds of supporters and opponents of the president were outside to witness the historic event.

Academics
The student-teacher ratio is 15, slightly higher than the state average of 14.

Sports
Interscholastic sports include:

Baseball
Basketball
Cross-Country
Football
Golf
Marching Band
Soccer
Softball
Swimming
Tennis
Track
Wrestling

Notable alumni
Greg Amsinger (1997), host of MLB Network and MLB Tonight
 Curtis Brown, NFL running back Buffalo Bills 19771982 and the Houston Oilers 1983
Josh Harrellson (2007), University of Kentucky, 2011 NCAA Men's Division I Basketball Tournament contender; NBA player for the Miami Heat
Connie Price-Smith (1981), Olympic shot putter and discus thrower; 2016 US Olympic track and field coach
Santino Rice (1993), fashion designer and television personality; contestant on Season Two of Project Runway
Dennis Tankersley (1997), former MLB pitcher, San Diego Padres, 2002–2004

References

External links
 

High schools in St. Charles County, Missouri
School districts established in 1899
1899 establishments in Missouri
Public high schools in Missouri